The 2014 China Open was a tennis tournament played on outdoor hard courts. It was the 16th edition of the China Open for the men (18th for the women). It was part of ATP World Tour 500 series on the 2014 ATP World Tour, and the last WTA Premier Mandatory tournament of the 2014 WTA Tour. Both the men's and the women's events were held at the National Tennis Center in Beijing, China, from September 27 to October 5, 2014.

Points and prize money

Point distribution

ATP singles main-draw entrants

Seeds 

 1 Rankings are as of September 29, 2014

Other entrants 
The following players received wildcards into the singles main draw:
  Bai Yan
  Feliciano López
  Andy Murray
  Viktor Troicki

The following players received entry from the qualifying draw:  
  Teymuraz Gabashvili
  Peter Gojowczyk
  Martin Kližan
  Mikhail Kukushkin

Withdrawals 
Before the tournament
  Lu Yen-hsun (playing at the Asian Games) → replaced by  Vasek Pospisil
  Dmitry Tursunov → replaced by  Pablo Andújar

Retirements 
  Ernests Gulbis

ATP doubles main-draw entrants

Seeds

 Rankings are as of September 22, 2014

Other entrants
The following pairs received wildcards into the doubles main draw:
  Novak Djokovic /  Filip Krajinović
  Liu Siyu /  Ning Yuqing

The following pair received entry from the qualifying draw:
  Johan Brunström /  Nicholas Monroe

The following pair received entry as lucky losers: 
  Teymuraz Gabashvili /  Mikhail Kukushkin

Withdrawals
Before the tournament
  Fernando Verdasco (personal reasons)
During the tournament
  Ernests Gulbis
  Filip Krajinović (sickness)

WTA singles main-draw entrants

Seeds 

1 Rankings as of September 22, 2014.

Other entrants 
The following players received wildcards into the singles main draw:
  Maria Kirilenko
  Francesca Schiavone
  Xu Shilin
  Zhang Kailin
  Zhu Lin

The following player received entry using a protected ranking into the singles main draw:
  Romina Oprandi

The following players received entry from the qualifying draw:
  Mona Barthel
  Belinda Bencic
  Polona Hercog
  Bethanie Mattek-Sands
  Monica Niculescu
  Tsvetana Pironkova
  Sílvia Soler Espinosa
  Xu Yifan

Withdrawals 
Before the tournament
  Victoria Azarenka (foot injury) → replaced by  Kaia Kanepi
  Dominika Cibulková → replaced by  Lauren Davis
  Li Na (retirement from professional tennis) → replaced by  Kirsten Flipkens
  Sloane Stephens → replaced by  Yaroslava Shvedova
  Vera Zvonareva → replaced by  Zarina Diyas

During the tournament
  Simona Halep (hip injury)
  Serena Williams (knee injury)
  Venus Williams (viral illness)

Retirements
  Daniela Hantuchová (left knee injury)
  Anastasia Pavlyuchenkova (dizziness)

WTA doubles main-draw entrants

Seeds

1 Rankings are as of September 22, 2014

Other entrants
The following pairs received wildcards into the doubles main draw:
  Simona Halep /  Raluca Olaru
  Han Xinyun /  Zhang Kailin
  Bethanie Mattek-Sands /  Zheng Saisai
The following pair received entry as alternates:
  Mona Barthel /  Mandy Minella

Withdrawals
Before the tournament
  Daniela Hantuchová (left knee injury)

During the tournament
  Casey Dellacqua (lower leg injury)
  Simona Halep (hip injury)

Champions

Men's singles

 Novak Djokovic def.  Tomáš Berdych, 6–0, 6–2

Women's singles

 Maria Sharapova def.  Petra Kvitová, 6–4, 2–6, 6–3

Men's doubles

 Jean-Julien Rojer /  Horia Tecău def.  Julien Benneteau /  Vasek Pospisil, 6–7(6–8), 7–5, [10–5]

Women's doubles

  Andrea Hlaváčková /  Peng Shuai def.  Cara Black /  Sania Mirza, 6–4, 6–4

References

External links
Official Website